Jiří Krkoška (born 2 March 1984) is a former Czech tennis player.

Playing career
Krkoška has a career high ATP singles ranking of 758 achieved on 8 June 2009. He also has a career high doubles ranking of 167 achieved on 22 March 2010.

Krkoška has won 1 ATP Challenger singles title at the 2009 Trophée des Alpilles.

Tour titles

Doubles

External links
 
 

1984 births
Living people
Czech male tennis players
21st-century Czech people